Cotter is a surname that originates in England and Ireland. It can also be an Anglicization, chiefly in North America, of a similar-sounding German surname.

Origin of the name
The surname Cotter has several different origins.

The English surname is a status name. This name is made up of the Old English elements 'cot' "cottage", "hut" and the suffix er. In the feudal system a cotter held a cottage by service (rather than by rent). Reaney gives the surname deriving from the Old French cotier "cottager" (see: villein). Early bearers of the English surname are Robert le Robert le Cotier in 1198; and William le Coter(e) in 1270 and 1297.

The Irish name is a reduced anglicised form of the Gaelic Mac Oitir. The personal name Oitir is the Gaelic form of the Old Norse Óttarr. The Old Norse name is made up of the elements ótti "fear", "dread" and herr "army". An early Irish record of the name occurs in 1142, when Mac Mic Ottir .i. Ottir ("the son of Mac Ottir, i.e. Ottir") from the Hebrides, is recorded to have assumed the Kingship of Dublin. For the origins of the noble Irish family claiming descent from this king see: Cotter family. Although unprovable, it is possible that both he and they are descendants of the famous Ohthere of Hålogaland, a great Norwegian adventurer who appears to have gone to Ireland. He is possibly the Ottir Iarla or Earl Ottir mentioned in the Cogad Gáedel re Gallaib, or at least related to him.

The surname can in some cases, mostly in the US and Canada, be an Americanization of the German surname Kotter.

Similar surnames
Similar, or related surnames include: Coates, Cottier, Kotter. Cotter can be rendered into the Irish language as Mac Coitir and Mac Oitir.

Distribution
According to  MacLysaght who wrote in the mid 20th century, the Irish surname of Cotter was peculiar to Co Cork. There are at least eight place names in Co Cork which incorporate the surname (for example: Ballymacotters near Cloyne).

List of persons with the surname 
Andrew Cotter (born 1973), Scottish sports broadcaster
Bill Cotter (born 1943), former Irish Fine Gael politician
Brian Cotter, Baron Cotter (born 1936), United Kingdom politician
Brigid Cotter (1921–1978), Irish and English barrister and chemist.
Cornelius P. Cotter, American professor of political science at Stanford University
Dan Cotter (1867–1935), American Major League Baseball pitcher
Ed Cotter (1904–1959), American Major League Baseball player
Edmond Cotter (1852–1934), British soldier who played in the 1872 FA Cup Final
Edmund Cotter (1927–2017), New Zealand mountaineer
Edward Cotter (politician) (1902–1972), Irish Fianna Fáil politician
Eliza Taylor-Cotter (born 1989), Australian actress
Garrett Cotter (1802–1886), Australian convict 
Imogen Cotter (born 1993), Irish cyclist 
James Cotter (judge) (1772–1849), farmer, judge and political figure in Upper Canada
James Cotter the Younger (1689–1720), son of James Fitz Edmond Cotter
James Fitz Edmond Cotter (–1705), commander-in-chief of King James's forces, in the Counties of Cork, Limerick, and Kerry
Jim Cotter (born 1964), Irish-born American writer, journalist, and broadcaster. 
Jeremy Cotter (born 1967/1968) New Zealand rugby union coach
John P. Cotter (1911–1993), Associate Justice of the Connecticut Supreme Court
Joseph Bernard Cotter (1844–1909), American priest and first Roman Catholic bishop of the Roman Catholic Diocese of Winona
Joseph Henry Cotter (1872—1937), Canadian politician in the Legislative Assembly of Manitoba from 1927 to 1932
Joseph Seamon Cotter Sr. (1861–1949), American poet, writer, playwright
Mick Cotter (born 1935), retired Australian politician
Patricia O'Brien Cotter (fl. 1970s–2010s), Associate Justice of the Montana Supreme Court
Richard D Cotter (1842–1927), Irish-American member of the first California Geological Survey
Tibby Cotter (1884–1917), Australian cricketer
Tom Cotter (comedian) (born 1963), American comedian
Tom Cotter (baseball) (1866–1906), American Major League Baseball catcher
Tom Cotter (environmentalist) (born 1972), American environmental advocate and community organizer 
Vern Cotter (born 1962), New Zealand rugby union player and coach
Wayne Cotter, American stand-up comedian
William Richard Cotter (1883–1916), English soldier and recipient of the Victoria Cross
William R. Cotter (politician) (1926–1981), Democratic Party member of the United States House of Representatives from Connecticut
William Timothy Cotter (1866–1940), Roman Catholic Bishop of Portsmouth (1910–1940)

List of persons with the given name
Cotter Smith (born 1949), American actor

See also
Cotter Baronets

References

Surnames